Ready to Go may refer to:

Music
 Ready to Go!, a 2007 album by Melody
 Ready to Go, a 2004 album by Bang Tango
 "Ready to Go" (Hurts song), 2017
 "Ready to Go" (Limp Bizkit song), 2013
 "Ready to Go" (Republica song), 1996
 "Ready to Go (Get Me Out of My Mind)", a 2011 song by Panic! at the Disco
 "Ready 2 Go", a 2011 song by Martin Solveig
 "Ready to Go", a 2016 song by Aruna
 "Ready to Go", a 2022 song by Yam Haus which represented Minnesota in the American Song Contest

Other
 "Ready to Go", a prepaid mobile telephone service of Vodafone Ireland